Muwisa (무위사) is a Buddhist temple in Gangjin County, South Jeolla province, South Korea.  Geungnakjeon Hall, National Treasure No. 13, is on the site.

History
Muwisa was built by Wonhyo during Shinla dynasty and its name has changed several times from Gal-ok temple to Mo-ok temple to Muwisa. Though it was first constructed in the 7th century, much of the area was destroyed during the Seven Year War in the 16th century. Until recent years, Geungnakjeon hall and other few parts were all that was left from the fire but due to preservation construction in 1974, Haetalmoon, Bunhyanggak, Chunbuljun, Mireukjun was restored. After Shinla dynasty, Muwisa played vital role as temple, serving buddha during Sejong, Sungjong and so on.

National Treasure
Geungnakjeon Hall is the 13th treasure of Korea. Most of the constructions in Muwisa was built before 1555 but this hall was found to be built in 1476, according to mural on the wall. Pillar evenly shares weight of the body and doors are located on all four sides covered with wood and changhoji, traditional Korean paper made from mulberry bark. Buddha statute is placed in the center with mural on corner of the hall and some mural which dates back to 15th century are excavated and preserved in National Museum of Korea. Geungnakjeon Hall and Muwisa is also well known for its scenery.

References

External links

Official site, in Korean

Muwisa
Muwisa